In the administrative divisions of France, the department is one of the three levels of government under the national level ("territorial collectivities"), between the administrative regions and the communes. Ninety-six departments are in metropolitan France, and five are overseas departments, which are also classified as overseas regions. Departments are further subdivided into 332 arrondissements, and these are divided into cantons. The last two levels of government have no autonomy, instead serving as the basis of local organisation of police, fire departments and, sometimes, administration of elections.

Each department is administered by an elected body called a departmental council ( [sing.],  [plur.]). From 1800 to April 2015, these were called general councils ( [sing.]  [plur.]). Each council has a president. Their main areas of responsibility include the management of a number of social and welfare allowances, of junior high school buildings and technical staff, and local roads and school and rural buses, and a contribution to municipal infrastructures. Local services of the state administration are traditionally organised at departmental level, where the prefect represents the government; however, regions have gained importance since the 2000s, with some department-level services merged into region-level services.

The departments were created in 1790 as a rational replacement of Ancien Régime provinces with a view to strengthen national unity; the title "department" is used to mean a part of a larger whole. Almost all of them were named after physical geographical features (rivers, mountains, or coasts), rather than after historical or cultural territories, which could have their own loyalties, or after their own administrative seats. The division of France into departments was a project particularly identified with the French revolutionary leader the Abbé Sieyès, although it had already been frequently discussed and written about by many politicians and thinkers. The earliest known suggestion of it is from 1665 in the writings of d'Argenson. They have inspired similar divisions in many countries, some of them former French colonies. The 1822 territorial division of Spain (reverted due to the 1823 French intervention ending the trienio liberal) and the 1833 territorial division of Spain, which forms the basis of the present day Provinces of Spain with minor modifications is also based on the French model of departments of roughly equal size.

Overseas departments have a three-digit number. The number is used, for example, in the postal code and was until recently used for all vehicle registration plates. Residents commonly use the numbers to refer to their own department or a neighbouring one, for example inhabitants of Loiret may refer to their department as "the 45". More distant departments are generally referred to by their names, as few people know the numbers of all the departments.

In 2014, President François Hollande proposed abolishing departmental councils by 2020, which would have maintained the departments as administrative divisions, and transferring their powers to other levels of governance. This reform project has since been scrapped.

History

The first French territorial departments were proposed in 1665 by Marc-René d'Argenson to serve as administrative areas purely for the Ponts et Chaussées (Bridges and Highways) infrastructure administration.

Before the French Revolution, France gained territory gradually through the annexation of a mosaic of independent entities. By the end of the Ancien Régime it was organised into provinces. During the Revolution they were dissolved, partly in order to weaken old loyalties. The National Constituent Assembly decided to create a more uniform division into departments (département) and districts in late 1789. The process began on 4 August 1789 with the elimination of provincial privileges, and a 22 December 1789 decree (with letters patent in January 1790) provided for the termination of the provincial governments.

The modern department system, as all-purpose units of the government, was decreed on 26 February 1790 (with letters patent on 4 March 1790) by the National Constituent Assembly. Their boundaries served two purposes:
 Boundaries were chosen to break up France's historical regions in an attempt to erase cultural differences and build a more homogeneous nation.
 Boundaries were set so that every settlement in the country was within a day's ride of the capital of a department. This was a security measure, intended to keep the entire national territory under close control.

The old nomenclature was carefully avoided in naming the new departments. Most were named after an area's principal river or other physical features. Even Paris was in the department of Seine. Savoy, during its temporary occupation, became the department of Mont-Blanc. The provinces continued to exist administratively until 21 September 1791.

The number of departments, initially 83, had been increased to 130 by 1809 with the territorial gains of the Republic and of the First French Empire. Following the defeats of Napoleon in 1814–1815 the Congress of Vienna returned France to its pre-war size and the number of departments was reduced to 86 (three of the original departments having been split). In 1860 France acquired the County of Nice and Savoy, which led to the creation of three new departments. Two were added from the new Savoyard territory, while the department of Alpes-Maritimes was created from Nice and a portion of the Var department. The 89 departments were given numbers based on the alphabetical order of their names.

The department of Bas-Rhin and parts of Meurthe, Moselle, Vosges and Haut-Rhin were ceded to the German Empire in 1871 following France's defeat in the Franco-Prussian War. A small part of Haut-Rhin, however, remained French and became known as the Territoire de Belfort; the remaining parts of Meurthe and Moselle were merged into a new Meurthe-et-Moselle department. When France regained the ceded departments after World War I, the Territoire de Belfort was not reintegrated into Haut-Rhin. In 1922 it became France's 90th department. Likewise the Lorraine departments were not changed back to their original boundaries, and a new Moselle department was created in the regained territory, with slightly different boundaries from the pre-war department of the same name.

The reorganisation of Île-de-France in 1968 and the division of Corsica in 1975 added six more departments, raising the total in Metropolitan France to 96. By 2011, when the overseas collectivity of Mayotte became a department, joining the earlier overseas departments of the Republic (all created in 1946) – French Guiana, Guadeloupe, Martinique and Réunion – the total number of departments in the French Republic had become 101. In 2015 the Urban Community of Lyon was split from Rhône to form the Métropole de Lyon, a sui generis entity, with the powers of both an intercommunality and those of a department on its territory, formally classified as a "territorial collectivity with particular status" and as such not belonging to any department. As of 2019 Corse-du-Sud and Haute-Corse are still administrative departments, although they no longer have the status of departmental "territorial collectivities": region and department functions have been managed by a "single territorial collectivity" since 2018.

Despite the intention to avoid the old nomenclature, often the names of pre-1790 provinces remained in use. For example the name of Berry, though no longer having an official status, remains in widespread use in daily life.

General characteristics

Government and administration 

This was determined according to the time taken to travel on horseback from the periphery of the department. The goal was for the prefecture to be accessible on horseback from any town in the department within 24 hours. The prefecture is not necessarily the largest city in the department: for instance, in Saône-et-Loire department the capital is Mâcon, but the largest city is Chalon-sur-Saône. Departments may be divided into .

Each department is administered by a departmental council, an assembly elected for six years by universal suffrage, with the President of the Departmental Council as executive of the department. Before 1982, the chief executive of the department was the prefect, who represents the Government of France in each department and is appointed by the President of the French Republic. The prefect is assisted by one or more sub-prefects based in the subprefectures of the department. Since 1982, the prefect retains only the powers that are not delegated to the department councils. In practice, their role has been largely limited to preventing local policy from conflicting with national policy.

The departments are further divided into communes, governed by municipal councils. As of 2013, there were 36,681 communes in France. In the overseas territories, some communes play a role at departmental level. Paris, the country's capital city, is a commune as well as a department.

At the 2001 census, the median population of a department in continental France was 511,000 inhabitants, which is 21 times the median population of a United States county, but less than two-thirds of the median population of a ceremonial county of England and Wales. Most of the departments have an area of between 4,000 and 8,000 km2 (1500 to 3000 sq. mi.), and a population between 320,000 and 1 million. The largest in area is Gironde (10,000 km2; 4000 sq. mi.), while the smallest is the city of Paris (105 km2; 40 sq. mi.). The most populous is Nord (2,550,000) and the least populous is Lozère (74,000).

Numbering 

The departments are numbered: their two-digit numbers appear in postal codes, in INSEE codes (including "social security numbers") and on vehicle number plates. Initially the numbers corresponded to the alphabetical order of the names of the departments, but several changed their names and some have been divided, so the correspondence became less exact. Alphanumeric codes 2A and 2B were used for Corsica while it was split but it has since reverted to 20. The two-digit code "98" is used by Monaco. Together with the ISO 3166-1 alpha-2 country code FR, the numbers form the ISO 3166-2 country subdivision codes for the metropolitan departments. The overseas departments have three digits.

Relation to national government 

Originally, the relationship between the departments and the central government was left somewhat ambiguous. While citizens in each department elected their own officials, the local governments were subordinated to the central government, becoming instruments of national integration. By 1793, however, the revolutionary government had turned the departments into transmission belts for policies enacted in Paris. With few exceptions, the departments had this role until the early 1960s.

Party political preferences
These maps cannot be used as a useful resource of voter preferences, because Departmental Councils are elected on a two-round system, which drastically limits the chances of fringe parties, if they are not supported on one of the two rounds by a moderate party. After the 1992 election, the left had a majority in only 21 of the 100 departments; after the 2011 election, the left dominated 61 of the 100 departments. (Mayotte only became a department after the election.)

Key to the parties:
 Divers Centre = Independents of the centre or Democratic Movement (Mouvement démocrate)
 Divers Droite (DVD) = Independent conservatives
 Divers Gauche (DVG) = Independent left-wing politicians
 MPF = Movement for France (Mouvement pour la France) (right)
 Nouveau Centre = New Centre (centre or centre-right)
 PCF = French Communist Party (Parti communiste français)
 PRG = Radical Party of the Left (Parti radical de gauche)
 PS = Socialist Party (Parti socialiste)
 UDF = Union for French Democracy (Union pour la démocratie française) succeeded by Democratic Movement
 UMP = Union for a Popular Movement (Union pour un mouvement populaire)

Future
The removal of one or more levels of local government has been discussed for some years; in particular, the option of removing the departmental level. Frédéric Lefebvre, spokesman for the UMP, said in December 2008 that the fusion of the departments with the regions was a matter to be dealt with soon. This was soon refuted by Édouard Balladur and Gérard Longuet, members of the committee for the reform of local authorities, known as the Balladur Committee.

In January 2008, the Attali Commission recommended that the departmental level of government should be eliminated within ten years.

Nevertheless, the Balladur Committee has not retained this proposition and does not advocate the disappearance of the departments, but simply "favors the voluntary grouping of departments", which it suggests also for the regions, with the aim of reducing the number of regions to 15. This committee advocates, on the contrary, the suppression of the cantons.

Maps and tables

Current departments
Each department has a coat of arms and a flag with which it is commonly associated, though not all are officially recognised or used.

Former departments

Former departments of the current territory of France

Departments of Algeria

Unlike the rest of the French possessions in Africa, Algeria was divided into overseas departments from 1848 until its independence in 1962. These departments were supposed to be "assimilated" or "integrated" to France sometime in the future.

Departments in former French colonies

Departments of the Napoleonic Empire in Europe
There are a number of former departments in territories conquered by France during the French Revolution and Napoleonic Empire that are now not part of France:

Notes for Table 7:
 Where a Napoleonic department was composed of parts from more than one country, the nation-state containing the prefecture is listed. Please expand this table to list all countries containing significant parts of the department.
 Territories that were a part of Austrian Netherlands were also a part of Holy Roman Empire.
 The Bishopric of Basel was a German Prince-Bishopric, not to be confused with the adjacent Swiss Canton of Basel.
 The Ionian Islands were annexed by France after the Fall of the Republic of Venice. They were lost to France, becoming the Septinsular Republic, a Russo-Ottoman vassal state, from 1800 to 1807, before reverting to France at the Treaty of Tilsit. The second period of French rule lasted until 1810/14, after which these territories became a British protectorate, as the United States of the Ionian Islands
 Maastricht was a condominium of the Dutch Republic and the Prince-Bishopric of Liège.
 On 6 June 1805, as a result of the annexation of the Ligurian Republic (the puppet successor state to the Republic of Genoa), Tanaro was abolished and its territory divided between the departments of Marengo, Montenotte and Stura.
 Before becoming the department of Apennins, the Republic of Genoa was converted to a puppet successor state, the Ligurian Republic.
 Before becoming the department of Arno, the Grand Duchy of Tuscany was converted to a puppet successor state, the Kingdom of Etruria.
 Rome was known as the  until 1810.
 Before becoming the departments of Bouches-du-Rhin, Bouches-de-l'Escaut, Bouches-de-la-Meuse, Bouches-de-l'Yssel, Ems-Occidental, Frise, Yssel-Supérieur and Zuyderzée, these territories of the Dutch Republic were converted to a puppet successor state, the Batavian Republic (1795–1806), then those territories that had not already been annexed (all except the first two departments here), along with the Prussian County of East Frisia, were converted to another puppet state, the Kingdom of Holland.
 In the months before Lippe was formed, the arrondissements of Rees and Münster were part of Yssel-Supérieur, the arrondissement of Steinfurt was part of Bouches-de-l'Yssel and the arrondissement of Neuenhaus was part of Ems-Occidental.

See also

 ISO 3166-2:FR
 List of French departments by population, area and population density
 Overseas departments and regions of France

References

 
France 2
France geography-related lists
Departments
Departments, France
Subdivisions of France